Ticky is a given name. Notable people with the name include:

 Ticky Donovan (born 1947), British karate competitor and coach
 Ticky Fullerton (born 1963), Australian journalist
 Ticky Holgado (1944–2004), French actor

See also
 Luther Burden (1953–2015), basketball player